White backlash, also known as white rage, is related to the politics of white grievance, and is the negative response of some white people to the racial progress of other ethnic groups in rights and economic opportunities, as well as their growing cultural parity, political self-determination, or dominance.

As explored by George Yancy, it can also refer to some white Americans' particularly visceral negative reaction to the examination of their own white privilege. Typically involving deliberate racism and threats of violence, this type of backlash is considered more extreme than Robin DiAngelo's concept of white fragility, defensiveness or denial.

It is typically discussed in the United States with regard to the advancement of African Americans in American society, but it has also been discussed in the context of other countries, including the United Kingdom and, in regard to apartheid, South Africa.

Sociology
White anxiety regarding immigration and demographic change are commonly reported as major causes of white backlash. The political scientist Ashley Jardina has explored those societal changes as a cause for white backlash and suggested that "many whites in the United States are starting to feel like their place at the top of the pyramid is no longer guaranteed and that the United States no longer looks like a 'white nation' which is dominated by white Anglo-Saxon Protestant culture."

In 2018, research at the University of California, Riverside, showed a perception of the "growth of the Latino population" made white Americans "feel the extant racial hierarchy is under attack, which in turn unleashed a white backlash." Similarly, a study from the European Journal of Social Psychology showed that informing "white British participants" that immigrant populations were rapidly rising "increases the likelihood they will support anti-immigrant political candidates."

Kevin Drum stated that with "the nonwhite share of the population" in the United States increasing from 25% in 1990 to 40% in 2019, the demographic shift may have produced a "short-term white backlash in recent years."

Regions

United States
One early example of a white backlash occurred when Hiram Rhodes Revels became the first African-American to be elected to the US Senate in 1870. The resulting backlash helped to derail Reconstruction, which had attempted to build an interracial democracy. Similarly, the 1898 White Declaration of Independence and the associated insurrection were reactions to the electoral successes of black politicians in Wilmington, North Carolina.

Among the highest-profile examples of a white backlash in the United States was after the passage of the Civil Rights Act of 1964. Many Democrats in Congress, as well as President Lyndon B. Johnson himself, feared that such a backlash could develop in response to the legislation, and Martin Luther King Jr. popularized the "white backlash" phrase and concept to warn of that possibility. The backlash that they had warned about occurred and was based on the argument that whites' immigrant descendants did not receive the benefits that were given to African Americans in the Civil Rights Act. After signing the Civil Rights Act, Johnson grew concerned that the white backlash would cost him the 1964 general election later that year. Specifically, Johnson feared that his opponent, Barry Goldwater, would harness the backlash by highlighting the black riots that were engulfing the country.

A significant white backlash also resulted from the election of Barack Obama as the first black US President in 2008. As a result, the term is often used to refer specifically to the backlash triggered by Obama's election, with many seeing the election of Donald Trump as president in 2016 as an example of "whitelash". The term is a portmanteau of "white" and "backlash" and was coined by the CNN contributor Van Jones to describe one of the reasons he thought let Trump win the election.

The Stop the Steal movement and the 2021 storming of the United States Capitol, occurring in the wake of the 2020 US presidential election, have been interpreted as a reemergence of the Lost Cause idea and a manifestation of white backlash. The historian Joseph Ellis has suggested that many who ignore the role that race played in Donald Trump's 2016 presidential victory are following an example set by Lost Cause propagandists, who attributed the American Civil War to a clash over constitutional issues while downplaying the role of slavery.

South Africa
In 1975, it was reported that the government was being slow to approve desegregating communities out of fears of an Afrikaner backlash. In 1981, The New York Times reported that P. W. Botha's cabinet colleagues, "sensitive to the danger of a white backlash," was publicly listing statistics that proved it was spending far more money per capita on education for white children than for black children.

In 1990, as apartheid was being phased out, Jeane Kirkpatrick wrote that President F. W. de Klerk "knows full well that several opinion polls show a strong white backlash against his policies." By the late 1990s, there were fears of a white Afrikaner backlash unless Nelson Mandela's ANC government permitted Orania, Northern Cape, to become an independent Volkstaat. By then, a former State President, P. W. Botha warned of an Afrikaner backlash to threats against the Afrikaans language.

In 2017, John Campbell proposed that "perhaps inevitably, there is a white, especially Afrikaner, backlash" at the removal of Afrikaner or Dutch placenames or colonial statues and the Afrikaans language with English at "historically white universities."

See also

Affirmative action bake sale
Angry white male
Birtherism
Culture war
Dog-whistle politics
Ethnocultural politics in the United States
Flaggers (movement)
Grievance politics
Karen (slang)
Obamagate
Race-baiting
Race card
Reverse racism
Right-wing populism in the United States
Southern strategy
Trumpism
Racial views of Donald Trump
Wedge issue
White defensiveness
White identity politics

References
Notes

Further reading

Race-related controversies
White nationalism in the United States
White nationalism in South Africa
White privilege
Intersectionality
Political sociology
Right-wing populism in the United States
New Right (United States)
Sociological terminology
Majority–minority relations
Criticism of multiculturalism
Cognitive inertia
Affirmative action in the United States
American political neologisms
Trump administration controversies
Opposition to affirmative action
Race-related controversies in the United States
2010s controversies
2020s controversies
Reactionary